This list of Russian chess players lists people from Russia, the Soviet Union, and the Russian Empire who are primarily known as chess players. The majority of these people are chess grandmasters.

A 
Vladimir Afromeev (born 1954)
Evgeny Agrest (born 1966)
Georgy Agzamov (1954–1986)
Anna Akhsharumova (born 1957)
Vladimir Akopian (born 1971)
Simon Alapin (1856–1923)
Vladimir Alatortsev (1909–1987)
Lev Alburt (born 1945)
Alexander Alekhine (1892–1946), world champion
Alexei Alekhine (1888–1939)
Evgeny Alekseev (born 1985)
Nana Alexandria (born 1949)
Farrukh Amonatov (born 1978)
Dmitry Andreikin (born 1990)
Vladimir Antoshin (1929–1994)
Fricis Apsenieks (1894–1941)
Ketevan Arakhamia-Grant (born 1968)
Valentin Arbakov (1952–2004)
Lev Aronin (1920–1983)
Vladislav Artemiev (born 1998)
Andreas Ascharin (1843–1896)
Konstantin Aseev (1960–2004)
Ekaterina Atalik (born 1982)
Yuri Averbakh (1922–2022)
Zurab Azmaiparashvili (born 1960)

B 
Alexander Baburin (born 1967)
Camilla Baginskaite (born 1967)
Vladimir Bagirov (1936–2000)
Yuri Balashov (born 1949)
Anatoly Bannik (1921–2013)
Evgeny Bareev (born 1966)
Anjelina Belakovskaia (born 1969)
Liudmila Belavenets (1940-2021)
Sergey Belavenets (1910–1942)
Alexander Beliavsky (born 1953)
Vladimir Belov (born 1984)
Benjamin Blumenfeld (1884–1947)
Boris Blumin (1907–1998)
Dmitry Bocharov (born 1982)
Efim Bogoljubov (1889–1952)
Fedir Bohatyrchuk (1892–1984)
Isaac Boleslavsky (1919–1977)
Igor Bondarevsky (1913–1979)
Valentina Borisenko (1920–1993)
Mikhail Botvinnik (1911–1995), world champion
David Bronstein (1924–2006)
Vladimir Burmakin (born 1967)
Algimantas Butnorius (1946-2017)
Elisabeth Bykova (1913–1989)

C 
Valery Chekhov (born 1955)
Vitaly Chekhover (1908–1965)
Alexander Cherepkov (1920-2009)
Irving Chernev (1900–1981)
Alexander Chernin (born 1960)
Konstantin Chernyshov (born 1967)
Maia Chiburdanidze (born 1961)
Mikhail Chigorin (1850–1908)
Vladimir Chuchelov (born 1969)

D 
Rustem Dautov (born 1965)
Yelena Dembo (born 1983)
Andrei Deviatkin (born 1980)
Maxim Dlugy (born 1966)
Yosef Dobkin (1909–1977)
Yury Dokhoian (1964–2021)
Sergey Dolmatov (born 1959)
Elena Donaldson (1957-2012)
Iosif Dorfman (born 1952)
Alexey Dreev (born 1969)
Daniil Dubov (born 1996)
Fedor Duz-Khotimirsky (1879–1965)
Mark Dvoretsky (1947-2016)
Viacheslav Dydyshko (born 1949)
Semen Dvoirys (born 1958)
Roman Dzindzichashvili (born 1944)

E 
Jaan Ehlvest (born 1962)
Vladimir Epishin (born 1965)
Yakov Estrin (1923–1987)

F 
Raphael Falk (1856–1913)
Alexei Fedorov (born 1972)
Vladimir Fedoseev (born 1995)
Salo Flohr (1908–1983)
Sergey von Freymann (1882–1946)
Semyon Furman (1920–1978)

G 
Aleksandr Galkin (born 1979)
Alisa Galliamova (born 1972)
Nona Gaprindashvili (born 1941)
Viktor Gavrikov (1957-2016)
Boris Gelfand (born 1968)
Efim Geller (1925–1998)
Edward Gerstenfeld (1915–1943)
Aivars Gipslis (1937–2000)
Anish Giri (born 1994)
Evgeny Gleizerov (born 1963)
Igor Glek (born 1961)
Leonid Gofshtein (1953-2015)
Alexander Goldin (born 1965)
Vitali Golod (born 1971)
Aleksei Goncharov (1879–1913)
Solomon Gotthilf (1903–1967)
Boris Grachev (born 1984)
Karen Grigorian (1947–1989)
Nikolay Grigoriev (1895–1935)
Alexander Grischuk (born 1983)
Eduard Gufeld (1936–2002)
Boris Gulko (born 1947)
Dmitry Gurevich (born 1956)
Bukhuti Gurgenidze (1933–2008)

H 
Alexander Halprin (1868–1921)
Grigory Helbach (1863–1930)
Alexander Huzman (born 1962)

I 
Ildar Ibragimov (born 1967)
Bella Igla (born 1985)
Alexander Ilyin-Zhenevsky (1894–1941)
Ernesto Inarkiev (born 1985)
Nana Ioseliani (born 1962)
Alexander Ivanov (born 1956)
Igor Vasilyevich Ivanov (1947–2005)

J 
Carl Jaenisch (1813–1872)
Charles Jaffe (1883–1941)
Dmitry Jakovenko (born 1983)
Lora Jakovleva (born 1932)

K 
Victor Kahn (1889–1971)
Gregory Kaidanov (born 1959)
Gata Kamsky (born 1974)
Ilya Kan (1909–1978)
Albert Kapengut (born 1944)
Nonna Karakashyan (born 1940)
Mona May Karff (1914–1998)
Sergey Karjakin (born 1990)
Anatoly Karpov (born 1951), world champion
Garry Kasparov (born 1963), world champion
Genrikh Kasparyan (1910–1995)
Paul Keres (1916–1975)
Alexander Khalifman (born 1966)
Andrei Kharlov (1968-2014)
Igor Khenkin (born 1968)
Denis Khismatullin (born 1984)
Ratmir Kholmov (1925–2006)
Natalia Khoudgarian (born 1975)
R.K. Kieseritzky (1870-?)
Viktor Knorre (1840–1919)
Mikhail Kobalia (born 1978)
Alexander Koblencs (1916–1993)
Dmitry Kokarev (born 1982)
Alexander Kochyev (born 1956)
Boris Kogan (1940–1993)
Alexander Konstantinopolsky (1910–1990)
Nikolai Kopilov (1919–1995)
N. Koppelman (1881–1944)
Viktor Korchnoi (1931–2016)
Alexey Korotylev (born 1977)
Nadezhda Kosintseva (born 1985)
Tatiana Kosintseva (born 1986)
Alexandra Kosteniuk (born 1984)
Alexander Kotov (1913–1981)
Boris Koyalovich (1867–1941)
Valentina Kozlovskaya (born 1938)
Vladimir Kramnik (born 1975), world champion
Michał Krasenkow (born 1963)
Boris Kreiman (born 1976)
Ljuba Kristol (born 1944)
Stanislav Kriventsov (born 1973)
Nikolai Krogius (1930-2022)
Arvid Kubbel (1889–1938)
Leonid Kubbel (1891–1942)
Sergey Kudrin (born 1959)
Viktor Kupreichik (1949-2017)
Igor Kurnosov (1985-2013)
Alla Kushnir (1941-2013)
Gennady Kuzmin (1946-2020)

L 
Konstantin Landa (1972–2022)
Emanuel Lasker (1868–1941, was born German but renounce German citizenship for Soviet citizenship later in life)
Alexander Lastin (1976–2015)
Anatoly Lein (1931–2018)
Isaac Lipnitsky (1923–1959)
Konstantin Lerner (1950–2011)
Grigory Levenfish (1889–1961)
Irina Levitina (born 1954)
Stepan Levitsky (1876–1924)
Vladimir Liberzon (1937–1996)
Andor Lilienthal (1911–2010)
Georgy Lisitsin (1909–1972)
Marta Litinskaya-Shul (born 1949)
Andrey Lukin (born 1948)
Anatoly Lutikov (1933–1989)
Igor Lysyj (born 1987)

M 
Elmar Magerramov (born 1958)
Sergey Makarichev (born 1953)
Vladimir Makogonov (1904–1993)
Vladimir Malakhov (born 1980)
Vladimir Malaniuk (1957-2017)
Boris Maliutin (1883–1920)
Maria Manakova (born 1974)
Svetlana Matveeva (born 1969)
Isaak Mazel (1911–1943)
Olga Menchik (1908–1946)
Vera Menchik (1906–1944)
Vladas Mikėnas (1910–1992)
Adrian Mikhalchishin (born 1954)
Vadim Milov (born 1972)
Artashes Minasian (born 1967)
Leopold Mitrofanov (1932–1992)
Abram Model (1896–1976)
Alexander Morozevich (born 1977)
Alexander Motylev (born 1979)
Jacob Murey (born 1941)

N 
Ashot Nadanian (born 1972)
Gia Nadareishvili (1921–1991)
Evgeniy Najer (born 1977)
Vera Nebolsina (born 1989)
Iivo Nei (born 1931)
Vladimir Nenarokov (1880–1953)
Ian Nepomniachtchi (born 1990)
Rashid Nezhmetdinov (1912–1974)
Yuri Nikolaevsky (1937–2004)
Nikolay Novotelnov (1911–2006)

O 
Handszar Odeev (born 1972)
Alexandra Obolentseva (born 2001)
Tõnu Õim (born 1941)
Vladimir Okhotnik (born 1950)
Lembit Oll (1966–1999)

P 
Sam Palatnik (born 1950)
Alexander Panchenko (1953–2009)
Vasily Panov (1908–1976)
Vasily Papin (born 1988)
Nikolay Pavlov-Pianov
Jusefs Petkevich (born 1940)
Arshak Petrosian (born 1953)
Tigran Petrosian (1929–1984), world champion
Alexander Petrov (1774–1867)
Vladimirs Petrovs (1907–1943)
Evgeny Pigusov (born 1961)
Igor Platonov (1934–1994)
Natalia Pogonina (born 1985)
Vladimir Potkin (Russia, born 1982)
Lev Polugaevsky (1934–1995)
Peter Potemkine (1886–1926)
Svetlana Prudnikova (born 1967)
Lev Psakhis (born 1958)

R 
Abram Rabinovich (1878–1943)
Ilya Rabinovich (1891–1942)
Viacheslav Ragozin (1908–1962)
Maurice Raizman (1905–1974)
Maaja Ranniku (1941–2004)
Nukhim Rashkovsky (1946-2023)
Vsevolod Rauzer (1908–1941)
Yuri Razuvayev (1945-2012)
Alexander Riazantsev (born 1985)
Nikolai Riumin (1908–1942)
Michael Roiz (born 1983)
Oleg Romanishin (born 1952)
Alexander Romanovsky (1880–1943)
Peter Romanovsky (1892–1964)
Karl Wilhelm Rosenkrantz (1876–1942)
Solomon Rosenthal (1890–1955)
Nicolas Rossolimo (1910–1975)
Sergei Rublevsky (born 1974)
Olga Rubtsova (1909–1994)
Lyudmila Rudenko (1904–1986)
Nikoly Rudnev (1895–1944)

S 
Peter Alexandrovich Saburov (1835–1918)
Peter Petrovich Saburov (1880–1932)
Nikolai Sahzin (born 1988)
Konstantin Sakaev (born 1974)
Yuri Sakharov (1922–1981)
Valery Salov (born 1964)
Grigory Sanakoev (1935-2021)
Vladimir Savon (1940–2005)
Emanuel Schiffers (1850–1904)
Alexey Selezniev (1888–1967)
Lidia Semenova (born 1951)
Aleksandr Sergeyev (1897–1970)
Gregory Serper (born 1969)
Yuri Shabanov (1937–2010)
Alexander Shakarov (born 1948)
Leonid Shamkovich (1923–2005)
Andrey Shariyazdanov (born 1976)
Miron Sher (1952–2020)
Sergei Shipov (born 1966)
Ilya Shumov (1819–1881)
Vladimir Simagin (1919–1968)
Sergey Smagin (born 1958)
Pavel Smirnov (born 1982)
Vasily Smyslov (1921–2010), world champion
Vasily Osipovich Smyslov (1881–1943)
Andrei Sokolov (born 1963)
Alexander Solovtsov (1847–1923)
Evgeniy Solozhenkin (born 1966)
Maxim Sorokin (1968–2007)
Genna Sosonko (born 1943)
Victor Soultanbeieff (1895–1972)
Vladimir Sournin (1875–1942)
Boris Spassky (born 1937), world champion
Leonid Stein (1934–1973)
Mark Stolberg (1922–1943)
Alexey Suetin (1926–2001)
Olga Sukhareva (born 1984)
Emil Sutovsky (born 1977)
Peter Svidler (born 1976)
Evgeny Sveshnikov (1950–2021)

T 
Mark Taimanov (1926–2016)
Mikhail Tal (1936–1992), world champion
Artyom Timofeev (born 1985)
Sergei Tiviakov (born 1973)
Vladislav Tkachiev (born 1973)
Alexander Tolush (1910–1969)
Evgeny Tomashevsky (born 1987)
Pavel Tregubov (born 1971)
Mark Tseitlin (1943–2022)
Mikhail Tseitlin (born 1947)
Vitaly Tseshkovsky (1944–2011)
Vladimir Tukmakov (born 1946)
Maxim Turov (born 1979)
Olga Semenova Tyan-Shanskaya (1911–1970)

U 
Mikhail Ulibin (born 1971)
Mikhail Umansky (1952–2010)

V 
Rafael Vaganian (born 1951)
Samuil Vainshtein (1894–1942)
Evgeni Vasiukov (1933–2018)
Gavriil Veresov (1912–1979)
Boris Verlinsky (1888–1950)
Yakov Vilner (1899–1931)
Isakas Vistaneckis (1910–2000)
Nikita Vitiugov (born 1987)
Alvis Vītoliņš (1946–1997)
Sergey Volkov (born 1974)
Alexander Volzhin (born 1971)
Evgeny Vladimirov (born 1957)
Larissa Volpert (1926–2017)
Konstantin Vygodchikov (1892–1941)
Alexey Vyzmanavin (1960–2000)

Y 
Yuri Yakovich (born 1962)
Lora Yakovleva (born 1932)
Leonid Yudasin (born 1959)
Mikhail Yudovich (1911–1987)
Peter Yurdansky (1891–1937)
Artur Yusupov (born 1960)

Z 
Vladimir Zagorovsky (1925–1994)
Alexander Zaitsev (1935–1971)
Igor Zaitsev (born 1938)
Viacheslav Zakhartsov (born 1968)
Tatiana Zatulovskaya (1935–2017)
Eugene Znosko-Borovsky (1884–1954)
Nikolai Zubarev (1894–1951)
Vadim Zvjaginsev (born 1976)
Kira Zvorykina (1919–2014)

See also
List of chess players
List of chess grandmasters

Russian
 
Chess